"You Save Me" is a song written by Brett James and Troy Verges and recorded by American country music artist Kenny Chesney. It was released in August 2006 as the fourth single from Chesney’s 2005 album The Road and the Radio. The song peaked at number 3 on the U.S. Billboard Hot Country Songs chart and at number 41 on the Billboard Hot 100.

Content
The song is about a man's enduring love for a woman.

Critical reception
Kevin John Coyne, reviewing the song for Country Universe, gave it a positive rating. He summarized his review by saying the song "is awesome, one of the best singles of his career." He then went on to say if Chesney followed up the single with the title song he would be 'two steps closer to the hall of fame'.

Music video
A music video was directed by Shaun Silva. It premiered on CMT on August 10, 2006. According to Chesney, the video took a total of 7 days to shoot, and was filmed in Mexico City. The video begins with Kenny Chesney as a member of the police department, traveling to a criminal spot in Mexico with three local police agents, presumably to make a raid. During the car ride, Chesney thinks back on his time with a girl he met and fell in love with in Mexico, and her attempts to persuade him not to go with them. The agents comment on how he appears to be nervous, to which he replies that it "didn't feel right". His partner challenges him briefly but allows him to walk away while they proceed with the raid. As Chesney starts to leave, he notices how the civilians in the areas are discreetly but uniformly retreating from the criminal spot or taking cover. He becomes suspicious and draws his gun, running towards the entrance, to which the agents had just entered. He is too late to save them, however, when an explosion tears through the building, leaving him as the only survivor. Chesney is anguished by the trap but can't help reflecting on his girlfriend and how she inadvertently saved him as the song begins. Throughout the song, Chesney is riding alone on a bus. As he travels through the country, he passes places he had been with his girlfriend. At the end of the song, he returns safely home to her and they embrace. Chesney is also seen performing the song during the video.

Chart positions
"You Save Me" debuted at number 47 on the U.S. Billboard Hot Country Songs chart for the week of August 19, 2006.

Year-end charts

Certifications

References

2006 singles
Country ballads
2000s ballads
Kenny Chesney songs
Songs written by Brett James
Music videos directed by Shaun Silva
Songs written by Troy Verges
Song recordings produced by Buddy Cannon
BNA Records singles
2005 songs